Ramazan Sal (born 27 June 1985) is a Turkish professional footballer who currently plays as a centre back for Sakaryaspor.

References

RAMAZAN SAL ŞANLIURFASPOR’A İMZA ATTI!‚ el-aziz.com, 10 January 2016

External links

1985 births
Living people
Turkish footballers
Association football central defenders
Boluspor footballers
Giresunspor footballers
Hatayspor footballers
İnegölspor footballers
Muğlaspor footballers
Pendikspor footballers
Samsunspor footballers
Bursaspor footballers
Şanlıurfaspor footballers
Süper Lig players
Sportspeople from Samsun
TFF First League players
Association football defenders